The Beaufort Gazette is a daily morning broadsheet newspaper owned by The McClatchy Company printed in Bluffton, South Carolina, in the United States.

The paper's staff works out of The Island Packet, where it is also printed.

Circulation figures 

McClatchy still officially lists the paper at a daily circulation of 13,890 and Sunday of 11,505; but the Audit Bureau of Circulation tracked 10,646 daily and 10,038 Sunday circulation as of September 30, 2009.

See also

 List of newspapers in South Carolina

References

External links
 The Beaufort Gazette official site
 Official mobile website
 The Beaufort Gazette contact information
 

McClatchy publications
Newspapers published in South Carolina
Beaufort County, South Carolina
Publications established in 1897